Ely and Walker Shirt Factory No. 5 is a historic factory located at Kennett, Dunklin County, Missouri.  It was built in 1923, with additions in 1934, 1936 and 1937. The original three-story section measures 50 feet by 154 feet and is of heavy timber frame construction with a brick exterior.  The later additions are steel frame construction. The factory closed in the mid-1980s.

It was listed on the National Register of Historic Places in 2008.

See also
Ely and Walker Dry Goods Company Building

References

Industrial buildings and structures on the National Register of Historic Places in Missouri
Industrial buildings completed in 1923
Buildings and structures in Dunklin County, Missouri
National Register of Historic Places in Dunklin County, Missouri
Textile mills in the United States